Antoine Dénériaz (born 6 March 1976 in Bonneville, Haute-Savoie) is a retired French World Cup alpine ski racer. He specialized in the speed events of downhill and super-G and is an Olympic gold medalist.

Dénériaz had three World Cup wins and six podiums, all in downhill. His first two podiums were both victories, at Val Gardena and Kvitfjell, during the 2003 season. He won his Olympic gold medal in the downhill at the 2006 Winter Olympics in Turin, Italy, trailed by Austrian Michael Walchhofer and Swiss Bruno Kernen. He also competed in the super-G, where he placed eleventh.

Dénériaz's hometown is Morillon, an alpine village not far from Mont Blanc.  He is married to former New Zealand alpine ski racer Claudia Riegler.

World Cup results

Season standings

Race podiums
3 wins – (3 DH)
6 podiums – (6 DH)

World Championship results

Olympic results

References

External links
 
 Antoine Dénériaz World Cup standings at the International Ski Federation
 
 

1976 births
Living people
People from Bonneville, Haute-Savoie
French male alpine skiers
Olympic alpine skiers of France
Alpine skiers at the 2002 Winter Olympics
Alpine skiers at the 2006 Winter Olympics
Olympic gold medalists for France
Olympic medalists in alpine skiing
Medalists at the 2006 Winter Olympics
Sportspeople from Haute-Savoie